The 2008 United States Senate election in New Mexico was held on November 4, 2008 coinciding with the 2008 U.S. presidential election. Incumbent Republican U.S. Senator Pete Domenici decided to retire instead of seeking a seventh term. All three of New Mexico's U.S. Representatives (Tom Udall, Steve Pearce, and Heather Wilson) retired from the House to run in this election, which was the first open Senate seat in the state since 1972 where Domenici first elected on this seat. Pearce narrowly defeated Wilson in the Republican primary, but Udall won the general election after an uncontested Democratic primary. 

In February 2007 Domenici indicated his intention to run for re-election. By October 2007, he changed his mind, stating that because of the progression of a medical condition, he would not seek a seventh term. Domenici also lost his chairmanship after Republicans lost control of the Senate in the 2006 Senate election, which may have inclined him against running. On June 3, 2008 Pearce and Udall won their respective nomination contests.

Democrats won this seat for the first time since 1966, the NM-01 House seat for the first time ever, and the NM-02 seat for the first time since 1981, and thereby gave New Mexico an all-Democratic Congressional delegation for the first time since 1969.

Democratic primary

Candidates 
 Tom Udall, U.S. Representative

Campaign 
After Domenici announced he was not running, Democratic Governor Bill Richardson was considered a leading candidate for the seat, but in October he affirmed his commitment to his presidential nomination campaign.

In October Albuquerque Mayor Martin Chavez entered the race for the Democratic nomination. In early November five-term Democratic Rep. Tom Udall entered the race. On December 7 Chavez withdrew from the race, saying "While I deeply appreciate all the support I have received, it has become very clear to me that Democrats should not be divided in the upcoming election."

Results

Republican primary

Candidates 
 Steve Pearce, U.S. Representative, and candidate in 2000
 Heather Wilson, U.S. Representative

Polling

Results

General election

Candidates 
 Tom Udall (D), U.S. Representative
 Steve Pearce (R), U.S. Representative

Predictions

Controversy 
Domenici and Wilson were both being investigated by the Senate for their roles in the dismissal of prosecutor David Iglesias. This may have affected Wilson's chances in the 2008 election.

In late October Pearce made 130,000 automated phone calls, which led Wilson to "cry foul." At issue was Pearce's use of the phone calls to justify his opposition to the State Children's Health Insurance Program (SCHIP) bill. The Wilson campaign claimed that "Pearce violated House ethics by urging those he called to contact him through his official, non-campaign phone number or check out his official, non-campaign Web site."

Finances 
The National Republican Senatorial Committee (NRSC) attempted to defend 23 Senate seats up for election in November. Committee chair Senator John Ensign identified the 10 most competitive Republican seats in June 2008. He was asked about the two Republican seats most likely to turn Democratic, Virginia and New Mexico. Ensign did not directly say whether the NRSC was considering walking away to work on other seats that can be won, but he said, "You don’t waste money on races that don’t need it or you can’t win."

Udall raised more than $801,000 prior to November 29. Wilson had slightly less, including a November Washington fundraiser with Vice President Dick Cheney that netted $110,000, bringing her total to about $750,000.

Debates 
The candidates agreed to three televised debates: October 15 on KOB-TV, October 18 on KRQE and October 26 on KOAT-TV. The AARP co-sponsored the second debate and the Albuquerque Journal co-sponsored the final debate. They also appeared together on Meet the Press in the fall.

Polling

Results

See also 
 2008 United States Senate elections

References

External links 
 Elections from the New Mexico Secretary of State
 U.S. Congress candidates for New Mexico at Project Vote Smart
 New Mexico, U.S. Senate from CQ Politics
 New Mexico U.S. Senate from OurCampaigns.com
 New Mexico U.S. Senate race from 2008 Race Tracker
 Campaign contributions from OpenSecrets
 Pearce (R) vs Udall (D) graph of multiple polls from Pollster.com
 Official campaign websites (Archived)
 Tom Udall, Democratic candidate
 Steve Pearce, Republican candidate

2008
New Mexico
United States Senate